The Turaga na Ratu ni Natauiya is one of the tribal chiefs who lead a sub-district in the district of Saivou in Ra Province, on the western side of Fiji. Five villages abide by the leadership of the Turaga na Ratu ni Natauiya:
 Nanukuloa
 Naiserelagi
 Burotu
 Tokio
 Rokoroko

The chief's royal house and residence, or Bure Turaga, is in the vanua vaka turaga (village called) Nanukuloa, where the Turaga na Ratu ni Natauiya normally resides. The right-hand man of the chief also resides in the village.

Fijian chiefs
Fijian nobility